Switzerland competed at the 1984 Winter Paralympics in Innsbruck, Austria. 50 competitors from Switzerland won 37 medals including 5 gold, 16 silver and 16 bronze and finished 7th in the medal table.

Alpine skiing 

The medalists are:

  Peter Bartlome Men's Alpine Combination LW9
  Peter Bartlome Men's Giant Slalom LW9
  Rolf Heinzmann Men's Alpine Combination LW6/8
  Rolf Heinzmann Men's Downhill LW6/8
  Rolf Heinzmann Men's Slalom LW6/8
  Hansueli Feuz Men's Downhill LW9
  Paul Fournier Men's Alpine Combination LW4
  Paul Fournier Men's Giant Slalom LW4
  Paul Fournier Men's Slalom LW4
  Felix Gisler Men's Alpine Combination LW5/7
  Felix Gisler Men's Giant Slalom LW5/7
  Walter Kaelin Men's Alpine Combination LW9
  Walter Kaelin Men's Giant Slalom LW9
  Heinz Moser Men's Alpine Combination LW6/8
  Heinz Moser Men's Downhill LW6/8
  Paul Neukomm Men's Giant Slalom LW6/8
  Elisabeth Osterwalder Women's Alpine Combination LW4
  Edwin Zurbriggen Men's Alpine Combination LW1
  Peter Bartlome Men's Downhill LW9
  Robert Cadisch Men's Giant Slalom LW9
  Eugen Diethelm Men's Giant Slalom LW4
  Paul Fournier Men's Downhill LW4
  Walter Kaelin Men's Slalom LW9
  Jean-Pierre Kurth Men's Giant Slalom B2
  Edwin Zurbriggen Men's Giant Slalom LW1

Cross-country 

  Armin Arnold Men's Middle Distance 10 km LW9
  Armin Arnold Men's Short Distance 5 km LW9
  Heidi Aviolat, Monika Waelti, Yvonne Wyssen Women's 3x5 km Relay LW2-9
  Josef Dietziker Men's Middle Distance 10 km grade II
  Josef Dietziker, Heinz Frei, Peter Gilomen Men's 3x2.5 km Relay grade I-II
  Josef Dietziker Men's Short Distance 5 km grade II
  Heinz Frei Men's Middle Distance 10 km grade I
  Peter Gilomen Men's Short Distance 5 km grade I
  Karoline Pavlicek Women's Middle Distance 5 km grade II
  Karoline Pavlicek Women's Short Distance 2.5 km grade II
  Monika Waelti Women's Middle Distance 10 km LW4
  Monika Waelti Women's Short Distance 5 km LW4

See also 
 Switzerland at the Paralympics
 Switzerland at the 1984 Winter Olympics

References 

1984
1984 in Swiss sport
Nations at the 1984 Winter Paralympics